Mniodes plicatifolia is a species of plant in the family Asteraceae that is endemic to South America.

References 

plicatifolia
Flora of South America